Khirbat al-Duhayriyya was a Palestinian Arab village in the Ramle Subdistrict. It was depopulated during the 1948 Arab-Israeli War on July 10, 1948, by the Givati Brigade under the first phase of Operation Dani. It was located 6 km northeast of Ramla.

History
In 1874 Clermont-Ganneau  noted the site, called Kh. edh Dh'heiriyeh, located about half an hour east of Lydda. 

In 1882, the PEF's Survey of Western Palestine  found at Khurbet edh Dhaheriyeh: "Foundations of buildings, apparently modern. Ruined kubbeh."

British Mandate era 
At the time of the 1931 census, the village, called Ez Zuheiriya, had 10 occupied houses and a population of 69 inhabitants, all Muslims. 

In the   1945 statistics the village had a population of 100 Muslims,  The total land area was 1,341  dunams,  of this, a total of 1,224 dunums  were used for cereals, 66 dunums were irrigated or used for plantations,  while 351 dunams were classified as non-cultivable areas.

1948, aftermath
Khirbat al-Duhayriyya was depopulated  on July 10, 1948.

In 1992 the village site was described: "The walls of some ten houses still stand. Otherwise, the village has been reduces  to piles of stone rubble interspersed with fig, doum palm, and almond trees, along with thickets of thorn and wild vegetation. The site is fenced in and serves as pasture for animals. Cactuses grow along the northern and southern sides of the site."

References

Bibliography

External links
 Welcome To al-Duhayriyya, Khirbat
 Khirbat al-Duhayriyya,  Zochrot
Survey of Western Palestine, Map 13: IAA,  Wikimedia commons

Arab villages depopulated during the 1948 Arab–Israeli War
District of Ramla